P. Allan Dionisopoulos (May 9, 1921 – July 6, 1993) was an American political scientist and legal scholar. A nationally recognized authority on the U.S. Constitution, his works have been quoted in U.S. Supreme Court decisions, as well as by a U.S. District Court in a Watergate-related case.

After earning several degrees from the University of Minnesota, Dionisopoulos earned his Ph.D. from the University of California, Los Angeles in 1960.

Dionisopoulos was a professor of political science at Northern Illinois University. He died in 1993 of congestive heart failure in Kishwaukee Community Hospital, DeKalb, Illinois.

References 

1921 births
1993 deaths
American legal scholars
American political scientists
Northern Illinois University faculty
University of Minnesota alumni
University of California, Los Angeles alumni
20th-century political scientists